Rogozna (Serbian Cyrillic: Рогозна) is a mountain in southwestern Serbia, near the city of Novi Pazar. Its highest peak Crni vrh has an elevation of 1,504 meters above sea level.

References

Mountains of Serbia